Henry Usher Hall (1876–1944) was an American anthropologist. He was Assistant Curator and Curator of the General Ethnology Section of the University of Pennsylvania Museum from 1915 to 1935.  He was instrumental in guiding the Museum's African collection in its early years.

He accompanied Polish anthropologist Maria Antonina Czaplicka (1886-1921) on an expedition down the Yenisei River in Siberia to the Kara Sea in 1914, together with Maud Doria Haviland (1889-1941), ornithologist, and Dora Curtis, artist.

He conducted excavations in the Dordogne in 1923, and in 1936-37 he led an expedition to Sierra Leone, where he investigated the Sherbro people.  On his return from Sierra Leone, he published The Sherbro of Sierra Leone (1938), which included an account of the secret Poro society of the Sherbro men.

References

External links
 Photos of Hall from the photo album of M. A. Czaplicka

American anthropologists
1876 births
1944 deaths